Brian Glyn Williams is a professor of Islamic History at the University of Massachusetts Dartmouth who worked for the CIA. As an undergraduate, he attended Stetson University, graduating with a Bachelor of Arts in 1988. He received his PhD in Middle Eastern and Islamic Central Asian History at the University of Wisconsin-Madison in 1999. An expert on history of the Middle East, he has written a number of books on Afghanistan, the War on Terror and General Rashid Dostum. His articles have been published by the Jamestown Foundation. As an expert in the country, he teaches courses on  Afghanistan at Umass Dartmouth.

Books

References

University of Massachusetts Dartmouth faculty
Living people
Year of birth missing (living people)